Communication released in 2003, is the first solo album of German electronic musician Karl Bartos.

According to Karl Bartos, the album is a concept album about electronic media:

Release
Some editions of the CD come in a special Burgopak-Case, which is unusual in that the CD tray and booklet both emerge sliding out from opposite sides of the case and must be opened together.

The limited edition was issued as CD Extra and contains the video clip for "I'm the Message" as well as a download link for two remixes of the song by Felix Da Housecat and Orbital.

The album was re-released on March 25, 2016 on CD and Vinyl, including remastered tracks and the bonus song "Camera Obscura".

Track listing

Personnel
 Karl Bartos – production, vocals, electronic instruments
 Mathias Black – mixing, mastering

Charts

References

External links
Communication Mini-site

Karl Bartos albums
2003 albums
Columbia Records albums
Concept albums
German-language albums
Synth-pop albums by German artists
Electronica albums by German artists